NCP may refer to:

Science and medicine
 Novel Coronavirus Pneumonia (a temporary name for COVID-19), an outbreak that was officially identified in late 2019.
 HIV-1 nucleocapsid protein 7 (NCp7), a target of zinc finger inhibitors
 Nucleosome core particle, part of DNA packaging in the nucleosome
 NCP, a protein in involved in chloroplast biogenesis
 National Centre for Physics, a physics research laboratory and facility in Pakistan

Computing and mathematics
 IBM Network Control Program, a program run on IBM programmable communications controllers
 NCP Engineering, a company that produces software for secure data communication
 NetWare Core Protocol, a network protocol used in Novell NetWare
 Network Control Protocol (ARPANET), the original protocol suite of the ARPANET
 Network Control Program (ARPANET), the software in the hosts which implemented that protocol suite
 Network Control Protocol, a protocol that runs atop the Point-to-Point Protocol
 New Cross Pacific Cable Network, an international submarine communications cable
 Nonlinear complementarity problem, a kind of a mathematics problem

Politics
 National Coalition Party, a Finnish political party
 National Centrist Party, a Libyan political party
 National Christian Party, a former Romanian political party
 National Congress (Sudan) or National Congress Party, a Sudanese political party
 Nationalist Congress Party, an Indian political party
 Nepal Communist Party
 New Communist Party of Britain

Other uses
 National Car Parks, a private car park operator in United Kingdom
 New Cross Pacific Cable System, a submarine cable system in the North Pacific Ocean
 North celestial pole, an imaginary point in the sky in the Northern Hemisphere
 National climate projections, climate (change) projections relevant to (and typically produced by) an individual country
 National Consumer Panel, a market research company
 National Contingency Plan, the United States federal government's blueprint for responding to oil spills and hazardous substance releases
 North Central Positronics, a fictional company in The Dark Tower series
 Northside College Preparatory High School, a high-school in Chicago
 IATA code for Naval Air Station Cubi Point
 National Check Professional, an expert in check processing rules and regulations, as designated by the Electronic Check Clearing House Organization
 Noncustodial parent, a parent who does not have custody of their child.